Full Moon is a 1998 Swiss-German film directed by Fredi M. Murer. It jointly won Grand Prix des Amériques, the main prize at the Montreal World Film Festival ex aequo with a Belgian entry La faille. The film was financed by the Swiss government.

References

External links
 
 Full Moon on pandorafilm.com
 Full Moon on swissfilms.ch

1998 films
1998 drama films
Swiss drama films
German drama films
French drama films
1990s German films
1990s French films